Martinus Dogma Situmorang OFM Cap (28 March 1946 – 19 November 2019) was an Indonesian Roman Catholic bishop.

Dogma Situmorang was born in Indonesia and was ordained to the priesthood in 1974. He served as bishop of the Roman Catholic Diocese of Padang, Indonesia, from 1983 until his death in 2019.

Early life
Dogma Situmorang was born in the village of Palipi on Samosir Island to an ethnic Batak family. He was the third child of the couple Joseph Iskandar Arminius Situmorang and Maria Dina Sinaga. His father was a Roman Catholic catechist who was one of the forerunners in the foundation of the Catholic church on the Samosir Island. On 26 December 1958, when he was 12, Dogma Situmorang's birth mother Maria died and his father remarried to Maria Else Sinaga. In total Dogma Situmorang grew up in a large family with 8 brothers and 6 sisters.

Religious life
When he was in his early twenties Dogma Situmorang joined as a novice the Order of Friars Minor Capuchin colloquially known as Capuchins. On 5 January 1974 at the age of 27 he was ordained a priest of the Capuchin order. On 11 June 1983 Situmorang was appointed to be bishop of Padang. On 17 March 1983 he was ordained bishop by Alfred Gonti Pius Datubara O.F.M. Cap. then archbishop of Medan, who served as consecrator. The principal co-consecrators were Raimondo Cesare Bergamin S.X., then bishop emeritus of Padang, and Anicetus Bongsu Antonius Sinaga O.F.M. Cap., then bishop of Sibolga.

Dogma Situmorang died on 19 November 2019 in a hospital in Bandung. He had been taken in ill on 8 November 2019.

References

1946 births
2019 deaths
People from North Sumatra
People of Batak descent
Capuchin bishops
20th-century Roman Catholic bishops in Indonesia
21st-century Roman Catholic bishops in Indonesia